Cydalima perspectalis or the box tree moth is a species of moth of the family Crambidae, first described by Francis Walker, the English entomologist, in 1859. Native to Japan, China, Taiwan, Korea, far-east Russia and India, it has invaded Europe; first recorded in Germany in 2006, then Switzerland and the Netherlands in 2007, Great Britain in 2008, France and Austria in 2009,<ref>Landwirtschaftskammer Vorarlberg: Buchsbaumzünsler wieder Aktiv.  In: Obst- und Gartenkultur Vorarlberg.</ref> Hungary in 2011, then Romania, Spain and Turkey. It has been seen in Slovakia, Belgium and Croatia.

It was during preparations for the 2014 Winter Olympics in 2012, that it was introduced from Italy to Sochi, European Russia, with the planting stock of Buxus sempervirens. The following year it defoliated Buxus colchica in large quantities.

It was recorded in Ontario, Canada in August 2018 and in the eastern United States in May 2021.

 Description 
Eggs are 1 mm in diameter, located under green unattacked leaves. First larvae just coming out from the egg are about 1–2 mm long. Larvae development brings them in four weeks to about 35–40 mm at maximum. There is some shrinkage at the beginning of the nymphosis, pupae are 25–30 mm long, first green with browning longitudinal lines, then more and more brownish. The wingspan of the adult form is 40–45 mm.  Two variants are observed, the most common one is mostly white while the other is most entirely light brown.

 Life cycle 
There are two or three generations per year with adults on the wing from April/May to September.. In the warmest parts of the European importation area, with cold conditions coming late in the year, there might be sometimes four generations per year. The species overwinters as a juvenile cocooned larva (about 5–10 mm long), protected in an hibernarium made of two leaving Buxus leaves solidly joined by silk.

 Host plant 

The larvae feed on the leaves and shoots of Buxus species. Young larvae only eat the upper part of the leaf, leaving the hardest inside structure. The leaves are not destroyed completely but appear as "peeled" in small parallel beats lines, or almost completely. These peeled leaves eventually die. Old larvae are the most damaging: they massively and completely eat the leaves, sometimes leaving a thin part at the contour and centre of the leaf, however. Green ball-shaped frass can usually be seen on host plants.

 Natural regulation or predation 

In the area of origin (Asia) natural regulation occurs, as witnessed by the non-destructive behavior of C. perspectalis. In the area of Europe where the moth has been introduced, the damage is very serious because natural regulation does not occur at a significant level. However, in European areas where the Asian hornet (Vespa velutina) is present prior to the introduction of C. perspectalis, some degree of predation by the wasp is observed (not confirmed by scientific and clear results). This is namely in the south-west of France, the first place where V. velutina was introduced to Europe in 2004 (C. perspectalis invaded this area in 2012). V. velutina is able to capture small larvae, and larvae preparing for the nymphosis in their cocoon. Where V. velutina has been introduced this causes other problems as it preys on honey bees and European honey bees are more vulnerable than their Asian counterparts.
Further research is conducted for the suitability of C. perspectalis for parasitoid species, such as the tachinid Exorista larvarum.

Control measures
Synthetic insecticides such as cypermethrin and deltamethrin are efficient, but must be thoroughly applied inside the bush and under leaves. Natural pyrethrin insecticides, extracted from Chrysanthemum and mixed with colza oil, can also be used. Spinosad, based on chemical compounds found in a bacterium, is also efficient.Bacillus thuringiensis ssp. kurstaki is a bacterium which produces an insect-specific endotoxin which perforates the caterpillars' gut lining, leading to paralysis and death.

Nematodes also have an action on the digestive system of larvae (difficult to adopt on this moth).

Pheromone traps (attracting adult males) are able to prevent impregnation of adult females and therefore control the severity of the damage. A more important proportion of sterile eggs is deposited by adult females. The selectivity of the pheromone is very good and useful indigenous species are not attracted.
Pheromone traps must be in place from March–April to October–November.

Insecticide, Bacillus'' and nematode treatments must be repeated three times at an interval of about ten days, because they mostly affect young larvae.

The species has become widespread in London and surrounding areas and has been ranked the top garden pest in Great Britain. Royal Horticultural Society provides an on-line survey to keep track of the pest.

Gallery

References

 Santi, F. Radeghieri, P. Inga Sigurtà, G. Maini, S., Sex pheromone traps for detection of the invasive box tree moth in Italy (PDF), in Bulletin of Insectology, vol. 68, nº 1, Bologna, Dept. of Agroenvironmental Sciences and Technologies, 2015, pp. 158–160, ISSN 1721-8861

External links

 How to remove box caterpillar
Lepiforum e. V.
 Informationen über den Buchsbaumzünsler
 Images
 UKmoths

Spilomelinae
Moths described in 1859
Moths of Asia
Moths of Europe
Taxa named by Francis Walker (entomologist)